Adam Maksym Rogacki (born 20 February 1976) is a Polish politician. He was elected to the Sejm on 25 September 2005, getting 6905 votes in 36 Kalisz district as a candidate from the Law and Justice list.

See also
Members of Polish Sejm 2005-2007

References

1976 births
Living people
Politicians from Kalisz
Members of the Polish Sejm 2005–2007
Law and Justice politicians
Members of the Polish Sejm 2007–2011
Members of the Polish Sejm 2011–2015